Ah Nge (born 28 December 1966) is a Burmese rock singer. He is one of the lead vocalists of the popular rock band Iron Cross. Ah Nge rose to fame with his debut album Wint Nyin Myar Nae Ka Khon Chin.

Biography
Ah Nge was born on 28 December 1966 in Inle, Shan State, Myanmar along with his elder brother Lay Phyu. He graduated from Mandalay University. Ah Nge married to Ma Thida, an assistant lecturer from Defence Services Technological Academy. They have two daughters. His eldest daughter, Lamin Kha, is also a singer.

On 21 June 2015, Ah Nge performed his solo show concert at the Myanmar Event Park (MEP), Myaynigone.

Discography

Solo albums 
Wint Nyin Myar Nae Ka Khon Chin (1993)
Sahara (1996)
Sate Ywat Hlay
Unplugged
Tha Chin Myar Ye Dan Dar Ye (1999)
Sa Hta Ma Arr Yone
Khu Nwit Htway A Ka
Zit Myit
Koe

Collaborations
95 Myanmar Billboard Top Hits
Chit Thu Tway Yae Tae Mhat Tan
Doe Yet Chit Thu Myar Nayt
IC UnpluggedIron Cross 20th Anniversary
Iron Cross Acoustics
LMN
Ma De Hint Sone Hmat Myar
Saunt Nay Tae Chit Thu Myar
Saw Bwe Hmu A Mhat Ta Ya 2
Tay Myone Nget Ye Hnit Nar Sel 2
The Best Of Our Love
We Love Sea Games
Yar Su Thit

References

1966 births
Living people
Burmese singer-songwriters
21st-century Burmese male singers
20th-century Burmese male singers
People from Shan State
Mandalay University alumni